Aechmea filicaulis is a plant species in the genus Aechmea. This species is endemic to Venezuela.

References

filicaulis
Flora of Venezuela
Plants described in 1865